The Nederduitse Gereformeerde Kerk launched mission work amongst Portuguese speaking refugees from Angola and Mozambique from South Africa. The work was led by Reverend ( later, Doctor ) Arnoldus Petrus Pienaar, Rev. Mario Alves, Rev. Pietar Botha, Rev. Eber Cezar, Rev. Samuel Coelho, Rev. Kruger du Perez, and Rev. Hermanus Taute. They established 5 Portuguese speaking congregations. A number of members begun returning to Portugal, to the former land of origin of some, or the mother colony. However there was no Reformed Church established in Portugal as yet. Reverend Petrus ( Pine ) Pienaar and later Reverend Mario Alves began visiting Portugal annually. In 1983 Reverend Pienaar settled in Portugal. These endeavors resulted in two autonomous congregations, the Reformed Church in Portugal. The first congregation was founded in Porto with 50 members in October 16, 1985 serving the northern part of the country, and the second was founded in October 26, 1985 in Lisbon to serve the centre of the country. These churches formed a Synod.
In 2005 Pastor Hermanus ( Manie ) Taute arrived to lead the Reformed Movement in Portugal.

External links 
Official website http://www.igrejareformada.pt/

References 

Reformed denominations in Europe